Ricardo Caballero may refer to:

Ricardo J. Caballero, Chilean macroeconomist
Ricardo Caballero Tostado, Mexican singer and television star